Marc Kühne (born 6 September 1976 in Halle, Saxony-Anhalt) is a German bobsledder who has competed since 1998. He won two medals at the FIBT World Championships with a gold in the mixed team (2007) and a silver in the two-man (2009).

Kühne also finished fifth in the two-man event at the 2006 Winter Olympics in Turin.

References

2006 bobsleigh two-man results
BSD profile 
Mixed bobsleigh-skeleton world championship medalists since 2007

1976 births
Living people
German male bobsledders
Bobsledders at the 2006 Winter Olympics
Olympic bobsledders of Germany